Nyíregyháza Spartacus is a football club from Nyíregyháza, Hungary. Formed in 1928, they've had brief stints in the Nemzeti Bajnokság III, they currently play in the second division. The team is locally referred to by their nickname, Szpari. They play in Városi Stadion, in the city sport complex just north of the downtown.

History

1960s
The team was refounded in 1959 by the fusion of the clubs Spartacus and Építők. In the early 1960s, the team entered the second division of Hungarian football and then the now non-existent NB I./B, a sub-division of the first division. These were the years of the so-called "golden team" featuring players such Bakos, Pilcsuk, Kovacsics, Páll Cini, Papp Szuszka, Szokol, Kaskötő, Ignéczi, Nagy Zoli, Harcsa, Groholy, and Csemiczky. The team, however, fell from the NB I./B in 1968, ending the golden age.

1980s
In 1980, the team finally ascended to the NB I. Their first match in the first division was played against Diósgyőri VTK, soon-to-be rivals from nearby Miskolc. The first goal was scored by Kozma "Kicsi" and Szpari won the match 2–0. The team finished the season in 7th place. However, the team was never able to improve from that season and they were relegated at the end of the 1983–84 season.

1998–2005
The team finally returned to the NB I. in 1998–99 and ended that season in 13th place. They finished 9th in 1999–00, but the league shrank in the 2000–01 season, ultimately only allowing 12 teams to compete and Szpari again exited the first division.

In the 2004–05 season, the league expanded to again allow 16 teams and Nyíregyháza again found themselves in the first division.  Though there were a few highlights including a masterful win over a declining Ferencváros to a home crowd in the second half of the season, the team ended in 15th place and were relegated yet again to NB II.

NB II Championship
The team had an unsuccessful first campaign upon returning to the NB II, finishing in sixth place overall at the end of the 2005–06 season. Next season they made a stronger case for themselves, spending most of the season challenging Ferencváros at the top of the NB II table.  On the occasions they faced each other the perennial Hungarian league favorites could only draw, 0–0 in Nyíregyháza and 1–1 to a crowd of over 13,000 in Budapest. With two matches left in the season the two teams were tied in the standings, but Nyíregyháza ended triumphant, winning the 2006–07 NB II Eastern division outright.

2007–2008
The team transitioned fairly well to the NB I. and finished in tenth place.

2008–2009
The team finished in 13th place with a great autumn (5th place) and a poor spring.

Colours and Badge

Stadium

Supporters
The team has several fan groups. The Keleti Front (Eastern Front) began in 1992, The Mastiffs in 1995, and most recently Elit in 2007. The fans have a friendship with Polish fans of Resovia Rzeszów.

Honours
Nemzeti Bajnokság II:
 Champions (4) : 1979–90, 1997–98, 2006–07, 2013–14

Seasons

Current squad
As of 5 August 2022.

Out on loan

References

External links
 Official Website of the Club

Football clubs in Hungary
1928 establishments in Hungary
Association football clubs established in 1928